Walter James Wilson (born October 6, 1966) is a former American football wide receiver and tight end in the National Football League who played for the San Diego Chargers. He played college football for the East Carolina Pirates. He also played in the World League of American Football for the Ohio Glory and in the Canadian Football League for the Baltimore CFL Colts and Memphis Mad Dogs.

References

1966 births
Living people
American football wide receivers
American football tight ends
Canadian football wide receivers
Canadian football tight ends
San Diego Chargers players
Ohio Glory players
Memphis Mad Dogs players
East Carolina Pirates football players